Daredevil is the second studio release from Fu Manchu, a Southern Californian stoner rock band, released on the Bong Load Custom Records label in 1995. This album features the "classic" Fu Manchu line-up of Scott Hill, Brad Davis, Ruben Romano, and Eddie Glass.

The album was remastered by Carl Saff in 2015, and is available on CD and LP on the band's At The Dojo label via their website, or digital download via iTunes and the Bandcamp website.

Track listing

Personnel 
 Scott Hill – guitar, vocals, producer
 Ruben Romano – drums, producer
 Eddie Glass – guitar, producer
 Brad Davis – bass, producer
Additional personnel
Tom Rothrock – producer
Rob Schnapf – producer

Credits 
Engineered and mixed by Rob and Tom. Assisted by Dennis Brower
Mastered by Stephan Marcussen
Cover photography by Gary Gladstone 1972
Fu Manchu photographed by Lisa Johnson
All songs by Fu Manchu 1995 Van-O-Rama Music/ASCAP
Project coordination by Surfer Brad

References 

1995 albums
Fu Manchu (band) albums
Albums produced by Tom Rothrock
Albums produced by Rob Schnapf